The Gambia Press Union (GPU) is a trade union for journalists in the Gambia. It was established in 1978 by a group of journalists, led by the veteran Gambian journalist and publisher William Dixon Colley (1913-2001). Other co-founders included Deyda Hydara (1946-2004), Melvin B. Jones and Pap Saine.

Around 200 journalists in the field of print and electronic media are registered members of the GPU.

List of chairmen and presidents of the GPU
 Melville B. Jones       (1978 - 1990) as Chairman
William Dixon Colley (1978 -1992?) as Secretary General
 Deyda Hydara           (1990-1998) as Chairman
Demba Jawo (1998 -2002) as Chairman
  Demba Jawo (2002-2005) as President
  Madi Ceesay (2005-2008) as President
 Ndey Tapha Sosseh (2008-2011) as President
 Bai Emil Touray (2011 - 2018) as President
Sheriff Bojang Jnr (2018 - 2021) as President
 Muhammed S Bah (2021 - ?) as President

References

External links
 GPU official website

Mass media in the Gambia
Journalists' trade unions
Trade unions in the Gambia

Trade unions established in 1978